Leonard Bernard Burton (born June 18, 1964) is a former American football center who played five seasons in the National Football League (NFL) with the Buffalo Bills and Detroit Lions. He was drafted by the Bills in the third round of the 1986 NFL Draft. He first enrolled at Northwest Mississippi Community College before transferring to University of South Carolina. Burton attended Oakhaven High School in Memphis, Tennessee. He was also a member of the Cleveland Browns.

References

External links
Just Sports Stats

Living people
1964 births
Players of American football from Memphis, Tennessee
American football centers
African-American players of American football
Northwest Mississippi Rangers football players
South Carolina Gamecocks football players
Buffalo Bills players
Detroit Lions players
21st-century African-American people
20th-century African-American sportspeople